Shahrak-e Shahid Rajai (also Romanized as Shahrak-e Shahīd Rajā’ī; also known as Shahrak-e Rajā’ī and Shahrak-e Shahīd Rajā’ī-ye Mīr Sālārī) is a village in Abolfares Rural District, in the Central District of Ramhormoz County, Khuzestan Province, Iran. At the 2006 census, its population was 117, in 22 families.

References 

Populated places in Ramhormoz County